The Texas Trail was a cattle drive trail from Texas to Nebraska that was used during the 1870s and 1880s.

It may also refer to:
 Texas Trail (1937 film), a 1937 film starring William Boyd as Hop-Along Cassidy
 The Texas Trail, a 1925 western film featuring Harry Carey
 Texas Brazos Trail, a non-profit organization which promotes heritage tourism, economic development, and historic preservation

See also
 Texas Trail Stone Corral, near Imperial, Nebraska, a surviving artifact of cattle drives along the Texas Trail, listed on the National Register of Historic Places